The Elsässisches Fahnenlied (the "Hymn to the Alsatian Flag") was written by Emil Woerth (1870-1926) in German when Alsace-Lorraine was part of the German Empire (1871-1918). It was adopted as the official anthem of Alsace-Lorraine in 1911.

After World War I, the short-lived independent Republic of Alsace-Lorraine became part of France in late 1918.

Lyrics

External links
Elsässisches Fahnenlied in mp3
http://www.deutsche-schutzgebiete.de/reichsland_elsass-lothringen.htm
http://emig.free.fr/ALSACE/Rot_un_Wiss.html

Alsace
1911 songs
Historical national anthems
German anthems
German Empire
National symbols of Germany
French anthems
National anthem compositions in F major